Córdoba, Córdoba Province may refer to:
 Córdoba, Argentina (in Córdoba Province, Argentina)
 Córdoba, Andalusia (in Córdoba Province, Spain)